Sunita Kohli is an Indian interior designer, architectural restorer and furniture manufacturer. She had restored and decorated Rashtrapati Bhavan (the President's House), Parliament House Colonnade (1985–1989), the Prime Minister's Office and Hyderabad House in New Delhi.

She was awarded the Padma Shri by the Government of India in 1992.

Early life and education
Born in Lakshmi Mansions, a noted Victorian building in Lahore, to Indar Prakash and Chand Sur, Sunita Kohli grew up in a liberal household in Lucknow as her father was an Arya Samaji and who had migrated to Lucknow after the partition. She studied at a Roman Catholic convent in Lucknow. Growing up her father would take her along to auctions and sales, looking for old lamps and furniture. Later she graduated in English Literature from Lady Shri Ram College (Delhi University) in New Delhi, followed by an M.A. in English from Lucknow University.

Career
She taught at Loreto Convent Lucknow, before the "accidental" start of her career in interior design. After her marriage, she and her husband started frequenting kabadi shops in their free time, looking for 19th century English furniture and lamps in Lucknow, Rajasthan and the hill resorts of Dehradun and Mussoorie. Soon Kohli converted her interest into an antiquarian business through which she sold Davenport desks and Regency wine tables. She learnt restoration of furniture from local master-craftsmen, which led to the start of her restoration business.

She established Sunita Kohli Interior Designs, an interior design firm in New Delhi, in 1971. In the following year was established Sunita Kohli & Company, which manufactures contemporary classic furniture and fine reproductions of Art Deco, Biedermeier and Anglo-Indian colonial furniture. Most recently, her company K2india whose CEO is her architect daughter Kohelika Kohli launched a fine collection of Mid-Century Furniture. Her career, added another dimension, when in the mid-1970s she established in partnership, another design firm which was commissioned to design a small hotel for the Oberoi Group, near the Khajuraho temples, The Oberoi in Bhubaneshwar and the Hotel Babylon in Baghdad. This firm closed but other hotel design projects followed in Cairo, Aswan and El-Arish in Egypt- The Oberoi Marriott Mena House Hotel and Casino, overlooking the Pyramids of Giza; two luxury hotel cruise boats on the Nile for the Oberoi Group; The Oberoi Aswan in Upper Egypt and The Oberoi in El-Arish, on the north coast of the Sinai Peninsula on the Mediterranean Sea. In the mid-1990s, she designed The Oberoi Philae Cruiser, another luxury hotel boat. For Mr. PRS Oberoi, she restored and decorated, for his personal use, the 250-year-old Naila Fort, near Jaipur.

Over the years she has designed several hotels, resorts and private residences in India and Sri Lanka. In Lahore, Pakistan, she has also worked on the restoration and conversion into a boutique hotel, of a late Sikh-period haveli in the Old City, over-looking the 17th century world heritage sites of the Lahore Fort and the Badshahi Mosque.  In the early 1990s, she did the interior design of the British Council Building in New Delhi. She also designed the National Assembly Building in Thimpu, Bhutan. This Parliament Building was again worked on in 2010, by K2INDIA for the SAARC Summit in Bhutan. She has also been involved in the restoration and redecoration of numerous British Raj period buildings in New Delhi, mainly designed by Sir Edwin Lutyens, Sir Robert Tor Russell and Sir Herbert Baker, including Rashtrapati Bhawan (formerly Viceroy's House), the Prime Minister's Office, Parliament House and Hyderabad House.

Sunita Kohli has been the Chairperson and Founder Trustee of an NGO, Umang, that worked for street and slum children. She is deeply involved in primary education and health. She is a Founding Director of 'Satyagyan Foundation' in Varanasi - an organisation that works with children's education, women's literacy, women's advocacy and women's empowerment through vocational training; and is the Chairperson of the Board of Governors of 'Save-a-Mother', an NGO which is dedicated to decreasing maternal and infant mortality rates in India. She is a Patron of the Women's Cancer Initiative in Tata Memorial Hospital, Mumbai.

In 1992, she was awarded the Padma Shri by the Government of India "for contribution to national life by excellence in the field of Interior Design and Architectural Restoration". In the same year, she received the "Mahila Shiromani Award", recognising women of achievement, by Mother Teresa.

In 2004, her younger daughter Kohelika Kohli, an architect and a Pratt Institute of Design, New York graduate returned to India, after working with 'Oliver Cope Architects' and interning with 'Foster and Partners'. She created an architectural firm, 'Kohelika Kohli Architects'. Eventually in 2010, they formed K2INDIA, bringing together all their respective companies. In 2010, she again got involved in the conservation work of Rashtrapati Bhavan, after a gap of 19 years.

In 2005, Sunita Kohli was instrumental in the conceptualisation and founding of the 'Museum of Women in the Arts, India' (MOWA, INDIA). Within MOWA, an NGO is being established for the empowerment of rural master craftswomen. She has been on the National Advisory Board of the 'National Museum of Women in the Arts', Washington DC.

Amongst many institutions, Sunita Kohli has been a guest lecturer at Harvard University's Kennedy School of Government Innovations, Emory University's Carlos Museum and Halle Institute, at Colorado College and at the National Building Museum in Washington DC. She has published and presented several papers; notably, 'Sir Edwin Lutyens and the Planning of New Delhi', 'Mughal Jewellery: Statement of Empire' and ‘World Heritage Sites in India: Monumental Statements of Faith and Empire’. She is a Fellow of the 'Halle Institute of Global Learning', Emory University, Atlanta, USA. Her essay on 'The Planning of New Delhi' is part of 'The Millennium Book on New Delhi', published by Oxford University Press. Her forthcoming books will be 'A Children's Book on Delhi's Architecture', 'Awadhi Cuisine' and 'Tanjore Paintings'. The first of these books has been illustrated by their three grandchildren - Anadya, Zohravar and Aaryaman.

In 2014, she was nominated as the Chairperson of the Board of Governors of the School of Planning and Architecture, Bhopal by the MHRD, Government of India, for a period of five years. In 2019, she joined the board of advisors at Rishihood University.

Personal life
In 1971, Sunita Kohli married Ramesh Kohli, an equity investor and alumni of the Doon School in Dehradun, St. Stephens College and Delhi University's Faculty of Law. They have three children- Kokila, Suryaveer and Kohelika and three grandchildren Anadya, Zohravar and Aaryaman.

References

External links
 'Happiness is always in retrospect' Indian Express

Recipients of the Padma Shri in arts
Indian interior designers
Indian brands
Delhi University alumni
University of Lucknow alumni
Living people
Conservator-restorers
Indian women designers
20th-century Indian designers
Artists from Lahore
Indian designers
Indian women architects
20th-century Indian architects
1946 births
21st-century Indian businesspeople
21st-century Indian businesswomen
21st-century Indian designers
21st-century Indian women writers